Obasi is a surname. Notable people with the surname include:

C. J. Obasi, Nigerian film director, screenwriter and editor
Chinedu Obasi (born 1986), Nigerian footballer
Onua Obasi (born 1988), British footballer
Patty Obasi (1951–2012), Nigerian gospel recording artist

Surnames of Nigerian origin